The Belgard District is a former district in Eastern Pomerania that existed from 1818 to 1945. The Belgard District belonged, successively, to Prussia, the German Empire, the Weimar Republic and the Third Reich. The district seat was the town of Belgard on the bank of Persante. The area under this former district is now split between two powiats: Białogard and Świdwin Counties, both of which are under the Polish West Pomeranian Voivodeship.

History 

In Pomerania, which had belonged to Brandenburg-Prussia since 1648, a district reform was carried out in 1724. The number of districts and associated district councils were significantly reduced in order lessen the strong territorial fragmentation that had arisen as a result of the complicated aristocratic possessions in Eastern Pomerania. The existing Belgard and Polzin districts were merged into Belgard-Polzinscher district in January 1, 1725. The district included the towns of Belgard and Polzin, the royal office of Belgard, and a large number of noble villages and estates.

As a result of the Prussian provincial authority decree of April 30, 1815, the district became a part of the region of Köslin in the Province of Pomerania. With the Pomeranian district reform of 1818, two villages of Brutzen and Groß Poplow under Netze District of West Prussia were added, and the district was renamed Belgard district after the seat of the district government. In 1828, the villages of Jagertow and Kollatz, which until then were in communion districts of Belgard and Neustettin, were fully integrated into the Belgard district.

In 1871, Belgard district included the towns of Belgard and Polzin, 73 rural communities as well as 95 estate districts. On September 30, 1929, as with the rest of the Free State of Prussia, a territorial reform took place in the Belgard district, in which all independent estate districts were dissolved and assigned to nrighboring rural communities.

In 1910, Belgard district covered an area of 1,132 squared kilometers. With the Prussian district reform of October 1, 1932, the district was significantly enlarged in the following ways:

 With the exception of the three communities of Labenz, Nuthagen and Rützow, the dissolved Schivelbein district was incorporated into Belgard district;
 The Neu Buckow district, consisting of the three communities Groß Satspe, Klein Satspe and Neu Buckow, were transferred from the dissolved Bublitz district to the Belgard district.

In the further course of the 1930s, the district name Belgard (Persante) was introduced. On January 1, 1939, Belgard (Persante) district received the designation of Landkreis in accordance with the now uniform Reich regulation. As of 1939, a total of 79,183 inhabitants lived in the district of 1,649.49 squared kilometers, with a population density of 48 inhabitants per squared kilometers. 48% of the population lived in the three cities of Belgard (16,456), Bad Polzin (6,920) and Schivelbein (9,714). In terms of area, the district was the fourth largest in the province of Pomerania, and fifth in terms of population size.

In the spring of 1945, the district was controlled by the Red Army. After the end of World War II, the district was transferred from Soviet to Polish administration in the summer of 1945.

Demographics

Politics

District administrators

Local government 
The Belgard district was divided into towns, rural communities, and - until their complete dissolution in 1929 - into independent estate districts. With the introduction of the Prussian municipal constitution law on December 15, 1933, there was a uniform municipal constitution for all Prussian municipalities starting January 1, 1934. Following the introduction of the German Municipal Code on January 30, 1935, a uniform municipal constitution came into effect on April 1, according to which the previous state municipalities were now referred to as municipalities, and they were grouped into county-level divisions called Amtsbezirk. However, new county constitution was no created, so the district regulations created on March 19, 1881 for the provinces of East and West prussia, Brandenburg, Pomerania, Silesia and Saxony still applied.

Districts, cities and communities

Administrative districts 
The rural communities of the district were divided into 40 Amtsbezirk in 1932. The towns of the district were not included.

Cities and communes 
At the end of its existence in 1945, Belgard district included three towns: Belgard, Bad Polzin and Schivelbein. There were also 126 municipalities:

Dissolved estates 

 Groß Dubberow, incorporated by Dubberow in the 1920s.
 Klein Krössin, converted into an estate district around 1908.
 Rottow, integrated into Mandelatz around 1908.
 Groß Poplow, integrated into Poplow around 1928.

Name changes 

 Seeligsfelde was renamed Eichenfelde on December 29, 1937.

Religion 
The population of Belgard district has belonged almost entirely to the Protestant faith since the Reformation. In the census of May 17, 1939, 96.6% of the inhabitants identified themselves with Protestantism. The proportion of Roman Catholic Christians was 1.4%, and Gottgläubigen (God believers) made up 0.9%.

Protestant church 
The parishes in the district belonged to the Ecclesastical Province of Pomerania of the Prussian Union of Churches. There were two church districts within the district's territory, namely Belgard and Schivelbein, whose boundaries largely coincided with those of the two former districts prior to 1932.

In 1931, the parishes of Karvin, Kerstin and Körlin were abolished, and the area was all integrated into the church district of Belgard. Meanwhile, Groß and Klein Satspe belonged to the parish of Seeger in the parish of Körlin; Tietzow and EWarnin were governed by the Schwellin parish in the Bublitz church district. When in the course of the dissolution of the district of Schivelbein Labenz, Nuthagen and Rützow were transferred to the district of Dramburg, the parishes of Labenz and Rützow remained with the church district of Schivelbein. Schlenzig became part of Petershagen in the church district of Kolberge and Ritzig, and would later became part of Wusterwitz in the church district of Dramburg.

With 58,750 members, the Belgard church district was one of the largest in the province. It comprised 18 parishes with 19 branch parishes with 22 pastors, 39 churches and 4 chapels.

The parish of Schivelbein had 26,689 parishioners in 13 parishes with 21 branch parishes, 14 pastors and 34 churches.

With the end of the Second World War, the number of Germans and thus also of evangelical Christians dwindled to a minimum. They were looked after by the parish office in Koszalin and belonged to the Diocese of Pomerania-Greater Poland of the Evangelical Church of the Augsburg Confession in Poland. In the Belgard Goergen Church, which now belongs to the Catholic Church in Poland, regular Protestant services are held in both Polish and German.

Catholic Church 
In the first centuries after the Reformation, there were practically no Catholics in the Belgard area. In the middle of the 19th century, its is still reported that the few Catholic Christians in the Belgard district were cared for from time to time by clergymen from the Catholic community in Köslin or Kolberg.

From 1887, Holy Masses were held in Belgard in an inn hall. Church building plans fell through. In 1915, the first post-Reformation Catholic priest took office in Belgard. In a carriage shed of a master blacksmith, there was a room that was sufficient as an emergency church.

On November 12, 1920, the foundation stone of a new church was laid, and the topping-out ceremony was celebrated on December 16, 1920. After the parish apartment could be occupied on July 25, 1921, the ceremonial consecration of the new church on Pankniner Straße took place on August 24, 1921. In 1925, the community had around 300 members.

In the summer of 1945, St. Mary's Church and St. George's Church in Belgard were dedicated to the Polish Catholic Church. The small church on Pankniner Straße was only used for communion and vicarage.

In Schivelbein with a catchment area to Dramburg and Rummelsburg, a dedicated pastor was hired in 1863. A private apartment rented in 1858 served as the chapel room. In 1868 the rented chapel was replaced by a separate mission house with a chapel, school and apartment under one roof. In 1883 the congregation was left to its own devices due to a lack of priests, and masses were held sporadically in Kolberg and Köslin.

It was not until 1900 that the community received its own pastor again. At the time, Schivelbein had 29 Catholics among its 7,700 inhabitants. In 1925 there were 50 Schivelberiners among 400 members of the entire parish.

Jewish religious community 
In 1826 a synagogue was built in Belgarder Jägerstraße. Until the First World War, there was neither overt nor hidden antisemitism. That changed in the 1920s, when the son of the master baker Klotz was shot during the Kapp Putsch in Heerstrasse, it was claimed that the fatal shot had come from a Jewish house, that of Herr Moses. Only gradually after this event did the situation calm down again.

The community had about 130 members in 1933. A boycott day was proclaimed on April 1, 1933, and SA men gathered in front of all Jewish shops. But at the time, there were repeated rallies of sympathy for the Jews.

Traffic 
Belgard and the former district town of Schivelbein had already been connected in 1859 to the Stargard–Köslin line of the Berlin-Stettiner Eisenbahn-Gesellschaft line (111), as well as the 111n branch line to Kolberg.

A line of Prussian Eastern Railway was connected to the town in 1878. In 1897, the Prussian State Railways ran a branch line from Schivelbein to Bad Polzin (111m); From there it was built in 1903 on the one hand to Gramenz and on the other hand to Falkenburg (111k+m).

Finally, the district town of Belgard became the starting point for two narrow-gauge railways, which were put into operation by the “ United Small Railways of the Districts of Köslin, Bublitz, Belgard ” in 1905 to Schwellin in the district of Köslin and in 1909 to Rarfin (113v+w).

Notable people 

 Rudolf Virchow (1821 - 1902), German physician and politician, was born in Schivelbein. His mother came from Belgard.

Galleries

References 

Białogard County
Świdwin County
1725 establishments
1945 disestablishments
West Pomeranian Voivodeship